Ocean Waves, known in Japan as , is a 1993 Japanese anime television film directed by Tomomi Mochizuki and written by Kaori Nakamura based on the 1990–1992 novel of the same name by Saeko Himuro. Animated by Studio Ghibli for Tokuma Shoten and the Nippon Television Network, Ocean Waves first aired on May 5, 1993 on Nippon TV. The film is set in the city of Kōchi, and follows a love triangle that develops between two good friends and a new girl who transfers to their high school from Tokyo.

Ocean Waves was an attempt by Studio Ghibli to allow their younger staff members to make a film reasonably cheaply. However, it ended up going both over budget and over schedule. In 1995, a sequel to the novel, I Can Hear the Sea II: Because There Is Love, was published. In the same year, a TV drama was produced mainly based on this work starring Shinji Takeda and Hitomi Satō.

Plot

In Kōchi, Taku Morisaki receives a call from his friend, Yutaka Matsuno, asking to meet at their high school. He finds Yutaka with an attractive female transfer student, Rikako Muto, whom Yutaka was asked to show around. Rikako is academically gifted and good at sports, but also arrogant. Taku believes she is unhappy about leaving Tokyo.

On a school trip to Hawaii, Rikako asks Taku to lend her money, as she has lost her own. As Taku has a part-time job, he lends her ¥60,000. Promising to repay him, she warns him not to tell anyone.

Back in Kōchi, the third year begins with Rikako making a friend, Yumi Kohama. Rikako has not returned Taku's money and he wonders if she has forgotten. Out of the blue, a distressed Yumi calls Taku, explaining that Rikako had tricked her into coming to the airport on the pretense of a concert trip, only to discover that their real destination is Tokyo, tickets paid for with Taku's money. He races to the airport.

Rikako's father thanks Taku, repays the loan and arranges a room at the Hyatt Regency. Rikako explains that when her parents were fighting, she had always sided with her father, but had now discovered he was not on her side. Taku offers his bed and attempts to sleep in the bathtub. The next morning, Rikako kicks Taku out so that she can change clothes to meet a friend for lunch. Taku wanders around the city. After catching up on sleep at the hotel, Taku receives a call from Rikako asking to be rescued from her former boyfriend, Okada.

Back home, Rikako ignores Taku, but tells her friends that they spent a night together. Taku confronts Rikako in class for hurting his best friend. They go to the corridor, where she responds by slapping him and he slaps her in return.

The autumn school cultural festival arrives and Rikako becomes more distant from the other girls, many of whom openly dislike her. Taku sees Rikako defend herself from another student who tries to assault her. Taku comments that he is impressed with the way she handled herself. She slaps him but runs away with regret. Yutaka punches Taku to the ground, calls him an idiot, and walks away. None of the three talks to each other for the rest of the year.

Taku, Yutaka, and Yumi reconnect at a class reunion several years later. Rikako does not attend. While reminiscing about school, Yutaka comments that the reason he punched Taku was because he was angry that Taku had held off on pursuing Rikako because of Rikako's mistreatment of Yutaka (and Yutaka's unrequited love for her). He was angry his friend had foregone a beautiful possibility on his account. The two watch the sun set and the ocean waves. Later, however, when Taku glimpses Rikako from across a platform, he realizes that he had always been in love with her. Rikako sees him and he smiles.

Characters

Main characters

Main protagonist. Taku, needing money for the school's trip to Hawaii, took his restaurant busboy job to offset the expense, at the cost of falling grades and his teachers' disapproval. Principled and trusting, Taku often gets himself into trouble.

Taku's friend and rival for Rikako's affections. Yutaka is a standout student and a class leader. Yutaka and Taku became friends when they jointly campaigned against the cancellation of their junior high school trip due to the school's low test scores.

Taku and Yutaka's love interest. From Tokyo, Rikako now lives alone in Kochi after her parents' divorce, and resents the town. Though sensitive and intelligent, she can be antisocial, and it becomes clear that her family life is troubled.

Supporting characters

Rikako's closest friend in Kōchi.

Female student-body president.

Rikako's ex-boyfriend. While in Tokyo, Rikako heads to a restaurant in the hotel to meet with Okada. Over the course of the meal, she discovers that he is not the type of person she once thought he was. He has also started dating Rikako's best friend. During the meal, Rikako telephones Taku to ask him to rescue her from the situation. When Taku met him, he thought Okada was really handsome.

Taku's large friend, who has a crush on Yumi. He confesses this love to everyone at the class reunion prior to Yumi's arrival, before collapsing into unconsciousness due to excess alcohol consumption.

Taku's Mother

Rikako's Father

Principal

Production
The film is based on Himuro's novel which was first serialized, with illustrations by Katsuya Kondō, from the February 1990 to January 1992 issues of Animage magazine. The monthly installments were collected in a hardcover book published on February 28, 1993, with some episodes omitted. Both the book and its sequel were republished as a paperback in 1999, with some pop culture references updated. Kondō served as the character designer and animation director for the adaptation. Production of Ocean Waves was controlled by Studio Ghibli, but much of the animation was produced with the assistance of J.C.Staff, Madhouse Studios, and Oh! Production, who had worked with Ghibli on past projects. This film is the first Ghibli anime directed by someone other than Hayao Miyazaki or Isao Takahata. Tomomi Mochizuki, who was 34 years old at the time, was brought in to direct. The film was an attempt to make anime solely by the young staff members, mostly in their 20s and 30s. Their motto was to produce "quickly, cheaply and with quality", but ultimately it went over budget and over schedule, and Mochizuki claimed he developed a peptic ulcer because of stress.

Reception
The review aggregator website Rotten Tomatoes reports that 89% of critics have given the film a positive review based on 18 reviews, with an average rating of 6.6/10. On another aggregator Metacritic, it has a score of 73 out of 100 based on 4 critic reviews, indicating "generally favorable reviews".

The website Animé Café gave the film 4/5 stars, noting it to be "A graceful and mature offering from Ghibli's younger generation". On the other hand, Otaku USA criticized the film, describing it as "[Ghibli's] most lackluster film in comparison to everything else they'd done until Tales from Earthsea".

Release and home media
The film premiered on Nippon TV in Japan on May 5, 1993, as part of the network's 40th Anniversary schedules.

Japan

Following its initial premiere, the movie was released on VHS and Laserdisc by Tokuma Shoten on June 25, 1993, through the "Animage Video" imprint. Originally, Ocean Waves was not initially part of the Disney-Tokuma deal due to its status as a television movie, but was eventually included as part of an agreement extension and so was re-released on VHS by Buena Vista Home Entertainment Japan on July 23, 1999.

BVHE Japan released the movie on DVD on August 8, 2003. A remastered version was initially released by Disney as part of the "Ghibli ga Ippai Director's Collection" boxset in December 2021 before gaining a standalone release on April 20, 2022.

A Blu-Ray release was released on July 17, 2015, by Walt Disney Studios Japan.

Internationally
In 2008, distribution company Wild Bunch announced that it had licensed the film to a number of European releasing companies, including Optimum. It was released in the UK under the title Ocean Waves on January 25, 2010 shortly before the planned theatrical release of Ponyo, as part of the Studio Ghibli Collection.

United States
Disney originally had the rights of distribution of Ocean Waves in United States, but they never released the film onto any home media platform, likely due to its more mature content when compared to most Ghibli movies. 

In 2016, GKIDS announced that they would release Ocean Waves in limited North American theaters starting on December 28 of that year and expanding during early 2017. It was later released on US and Canada from January 3, to March 24, 2017. The film earned US$12,039 upon its screenings on December 28, 2016.

The film was released on DVD and Blu-ray by GKIDS on April 18, 2017, with only the Japanese audio with English subtitles.

References

External links

Ocean Waves at Nausicaa.net

1990 Japanese novels
1993 anime films
1993 films
1993 romantic drama films
1993 television films
1995 Japanese novels
1990s high school films
1990s Japanese-language films
1990s teen drama films
1990s teen romance films
Anime television films
Drama anime and manga
Drama television films
Films based on Japanese novels
Japanese adult animated films
Japanese high school films
Japanese romantic drama films
Japanese teen drama films
Japanese television films
Romance anime and manga
Romance television films
School life in anime and manga
Studio Ghibli animated films
Television shows based on light novels